WBLC (1360 AM) is a Christian radio station licensed to Lenoir City, Tennessee, United States.  The station is owned by LifeTalk Radio, Inc.

References

External links

Radio stations established in 1974
1974 establishments in Tennessee
BLC
Loudon County, Tennessee